Lohajang ( [meaning rusting of iron]) is an upazila of Munshiganj District in the Division of Dhaka, Bangladesh.

Geography
It has a total area of 130.12 km2.

Demographics

According to the 2011 Bangladesh census, Louhajang Upazila had 36,554 households and a population of 159,242, 2.7% of whom lived in urban areas. 9.5% of the population was under the age of 5. The literacy rate (age 7 and over) was 45.9%, compared to the national average of 51.8%.

Administration
Louhajang Upazila is divided into ten union parishads: Baultoli, Bejgaon, Gaodia, Haldia, Kalma, Kanaksar, Khidirpara, Kumarbhog, Lohajang-Teotia, and Medinimandal. The union parishads are subdivided into 115 mauzas and 114 villages.

See also
Upazilas of Bangladesh
Districts of Bangladesh
Divisions of Bangladesh

References

Upazilas of Munshiganj District